Tristan Bowen (born January 30, 1991) is an American professional soccer player. Bowen was the first ever homegrown player in MLS history.

Career

Youth
Bowen, who was homeschooled, forwent college although he was offered a scholarship to UCLA, and joined LA Galaxy's youth academy, Galaxy Rios, on March 15, 2007.

Bowen played for Galaxy Rios at the 2008 SUM U-17 Cup, and later helped the team win the Pacific Southern California Division of the USL Super-20 League.

Professional
Bowen played several games with Galaxy's reserves in the MLS Reserve Division towards the end of the 2008 season, and was formally signed by the senior LA Galaxy team on November 12, 2008, making him the first player in MLS history to be signed directly from his club's Youth Academy. He played during Galaxy's pre-season tour of Oceania in February 2009, and made his professional debut on April 7, 2009, in the Lamar Hunt U.S. Open Cup against Colorado Rapids. He made his MLS debut on June 20, 2009, in a game against San Jose Earthquakes.

With the MLS Reserve Division having been scrapped at the end of 2008, Galaxy also loaned Bowen to the Hollywood United Hitmen of the USL Premier Development League and to Miami FC of the USL First Division for part of the 2009 season, to maintain his match fitness levels.

Bowen was traded to city rivals Chivas USA on December 15, 2010 in exchange for allocation money and a split of any future foreign transfer fee received for the player.

On August 26, 2011, Chivas USA announced that Bowen had been loaned out to K.S.V. Roeselare of the Belgian Second Division. Bowen returned from his loan stint on May 17, 2012.

Bowen was traded to Seattle Sounders FC in exchange for Mauro Rosales on December 11, 2013.

The Sounders and Bowen part ways at the conclusion of the 2014 season. In December 2014, Bowen entered the 2014 MLS Re-Entry Draft and was selected in stage two by New England Revolution. He did not agree to terms with New England.

In August 2015, Bowen signed with KuPS in the Finnish Veikkausliiga.

In February 2016, Bowen signed with AFC United in Sweden. He helped the club win promotion to Allesvenska, Sweden's first division.

In January 2020, Bowen came out of a three-year retirement and signed with Oakland Roots SC ahead of the team's spring season in the National Independent Soccer Association.

International
Bowen has played for the United States U-18 and U-20 national teams, including three games in November 2008, during which he played friendly games against Spanish La Liga teams Real Madrid, Atlético Madrid and Rayo Vallecano. He is eligible to represent Jamaica through parentage.

Honors

LA Galaxy
Major League Soccer Supporter's Shield (1): 2010

Seattle Sounders FC
U.S. Open Cup Champion (1): 2014
Major League Soccer Supporter's Shield (1): 2014

AFC Eskilstuna
Promotion to Allsvenskan (2016)

References

External links

1991 births
Living people
American expatriate soccer players
American soccer players
Association football forwards
Challenger Pro League players
Chivas USA players
Expatriate footballers in Belgium
Expatriate footballers in Finland
Hollywood United Hitmen players
LA Galaxy players
Major League Soccer players
Miami FC (2006) players
K.S.V. Roeselare players
Kuopion Palloseura players
San Fernando Valley Quakes players
Seattle Sounders FC players
Oakland Roots SC players
Soccer players from Los Angeles
United States men's under-20 international soccer players
United States men's youth international soccer players
USL First Division players
USL League Two players
Veikkausliiga players
American expatriate sportspeople in Belgium
American expatriate sportspeople in Finland
American expatriate sportspeople in Sweden
Expatriate footballers in Sweden
Homegrown Players (MLS)